Emily Appleton (born 1 September 1999) is a British tennis player.

Appleton has career-high rankings by the WTA of 472 in singles, achieved on 27 February 2023, and 180 in doubles, set on 17 October 2022.

Appleton made her WTA Tour main-draw debut at the 2022 Birmingham Classic, in the doubles draw, partnering Ali Collins.

ITF Circuit finals

Singles: 7 (3 titles, 4 runner-ups)

Doubles: 33 (12 titles, 21 runner-ups)

Notes

References

External links

1999 births
Living people
British female tennis players
21st-century British women